Xpand Rally is a rally racing game from Polish developer Techland for Microsoft Windows. The game focuses primarily on realistic graphics as well as physics. It contains 60 tracks where players can drive against 120 different rally drivers.

Reception

The game received "favorable" reviews according to the review aggregation website Metacritic.

Xpand Rally Xtreme

Xpand Rally Xtreme, a sequel to Xpand Rally, was released in December 6, 2006.

Xpand Rally Xtreme contains similar content to the original Xpand Rally. In-game, apart from well-known rally cars, gamers find GT vehicles, DTR group buggies, and off-road 4x4 cars and Monster Trucks vehicle groups. The game also presents about 40 tracks in typical SS contests, off-road cross-country rides, and track races against challenging opponents.{{citation 

Like the original Xpand Rally, the game contains career, single race and multiplayer modes. It is based on the Chrome Engine and players will get the Chromed editor to create their own tracks and game modes.

References

External links
 Techland Website (English)

2004 video games
2006 video games
Off-road racing video games
Rally racing video games
Video games set in Arizona
Video games set in Finland
Video games set in Ireland
Video games set in Kenya
Video games set in Poland
Video games developed in Poland
Video games developed in the United States
Windows games
Windows-only games
Multiplayer and single-player video games
Techland games
TopWare Interactive games